De Bruyne is a Dutch surname meaning "the brown one". The name is variably spelled Debruyne or De Bruijne as well. More common forms are De Bruin, De Bruijn, and De Bruyn. 

People with this surname include:

Donatien de Bruyne (1871–1935), French biblical scholar
Fred De Bruyne (1930–1994), Belgian road race cyclist
Gustave De Bruyne (fl. 1920), Belgian long jumper
 (1917–1995), Belgian politician
Henri De Bruyne (1868–1892), Belgian Congo Free State sergeant
Kamiel De Bruyne (born 1992), Belgian television producer
Kevin De Bruyne (born 1991), Belgian footballer
Kris De Bruyne (1950–2021), Belgian singer
 (1895–1973), Dutch military leader
Norman de Bruyne (1904–1997), British aircraft engineer and industrialist
Pierre De Bruyne (1905–?), Belgian cyclist
Rykel de Bruyne, Dutch malacologist

See also
De Bruyn
De Bruijn
De Bruin

Dutch-language surnames